Uzair  Gul Peshawari (1886 – 17 November 1989) was a South Asian Islamic scholar and an activist of the Indian freedom struggle who actively participated in the Silk Letter Movement. He was an alumnus of the Darul Uloom Deoband and served as the head-teacher of Madrasa Rahmania in Roorkee.

Biography
Gul hailed from Ziarat Kaka Sahib, a town located in Peshawar. He completed his primary studies with local teachers and moved to Darul Uloom Deoband, where he studied with Mahmud Hasan Deobandi. He graduated from Darul Uloom in 1331 A.H. During Khilafat Movement, Gul was made the president of Khilafat Committee in Deoband. He was a close companion of Mahmud Hasan Deobandi and was imprisoned along with him in Malta for his role in the Silk Letter Movement.

He served as a teacher at Darul Uloom Deoband and before World War II, he was appointed as a head-teacher in Madrasa Rahmania in Roorkee.

In 1945, Gul moved to his native place in Peshawar along-with his English wife Beatrice Cooke.

Gul died on 17 November 1989.

Family
Gul's first wife was a daughter of Mahmud Hasan Deobandi's niece. During his stay at Roorkee, he married a new Muslim English woman named Beatrice Cooke. Gul's second wife Cooke also wrote an English translation of Quran which remains unpublished.

Legacy
 At University of Peshawar, Murad Ali Shah wrote a Master of Arts thesis entitled Mawlāna Uzair Gul-The Prisoner of Malta.
 At University of Islamabad, Farzana Nisar wrote a Master of Philosophy thesis entitled Mawlāna Uzair Gul (Aseer-i-Malta): His Life and Achievements.

References

Darul Uloom Deoband alumni
People from Peshawar
Deobandis
Indian independence activists
1989 deaths
1886 births
People from Nowshera District
Pakistani centenarians
Men centenarians
Students of Mahmud Hasan Deobandi
Academic staff of Darul Uloom Deoband